La Vandeana is an Italian song focusing on the topic of the counter-revolution against the Jacobins' anticlerical republican system by Royalists and Catholics during the War in the Vendée in France. The folk song is popular in traditionalist circles and it was also used by intransigent radical right cultural organisation Ordine Nuovo as their group anthem. Various slightly different versions of the song have been recorded, including versions by Contea and Settimo Sigillo.

Lyrics

See also
 La Marseillaise des Blancs
 Oriamendi

References

External links
La Vandeana

Italian songs
Counter-revolutionaries